Will Levis (born June 27, 1999) is an American football quarterback for the Kentucky Wildcats. He previously played for the Penn State Nittany Lions before transferring to Kentucky in 2021.

High school career
Levis was born on June 27, 1999, in Newton, Massachusetts, later attending Xavier High School in Middletown, Connecticut. He set school records as a senior for passing touchdowns with 27 and passing yards with 2,793. He committed to Penn State to play college football.

College career

Penn State
Levis attended Penn State from 2018 to 2020. After redshirting his first year, he spent the next two as Sean Clifford's backup. He made his first career start against Rutgers in 2019, completing eight of 14 passes for 81 yards with one touchdown and one interception with 108 rushing yards. Overall at Penn State, he completed 61 of 102 passes for 644 yards, three  touchdowns and two interceptions. He also rushed for 473 yards and six touchdowns.

Kentucky
Levis transferred to the University of Kentucky in 2021, after having graduated that May with a bachelor's degree in finance from Penn State's Smeal College of Business. He was named the starter to open the season and in his first start threw for 367 yards and four touchdowns. Levis started all 13 games for Kentucky, completing 233 of 353 passes for 2,827 yards and 24 touchdown passes while running for 376 yards and 9 touchdowns on 107 rushes. Levis led the team to a victory over No. 15 Iowa in the 2022 Citrus Bowl.

Statistics

Personal life 
His father Mike played football at Denison University, an NCAA Division III school in Ohio, while his mother, Beth Kelley, was a two-time All-American soccer player at Yale. An uncle played football at Yale, and his maternal great-grandfather Alva Kelley was an All-American football player at Cornell University and later a head coach for several college teams. Levis graduated with a master's degree in finance from Kentucky's Gatton College of Business and Economics.

He has quirky food habits, specifically drinking coffee with mayonnaise and eating unpeeled bananas.

References

External links
 Kentucky Wildcats bio
 Penn State Nittany Lions bio

1999 births
Living people
People from Madison, Connecticut
Players of American football from Connecticut
American football quarterbacks
Penn State Nittany Lions football players
Kentucky Wildcats football players
Gatton College of Business and Economics alumni
Smeal College of Business alumni